Kim Possible: A Sitch in Time is a 2003 American made-for-TV animated film by Walt Disney Television Animation. It is the first film based on the original television series Kim Possible. The film was directed by Steve Loter for the Disney Channel, and was created with a mix of traditional and computer-generated animation. The starring voices are Christy Carlson Romano as the title character and Will Friedle as her sidekick and best friend Ron Stoppable. This is the first feature-length film based on the Kim Possible TV show, followed by So the Drama in 2005.

Plot
Kim Possible is a high-school cheerleader and world-famous crime fighter, and Ron Stoppable is her faithful sidekick and best friend, who has a pet naked mole-rat named Rufus. The film begins at the start of a new school year, which Ron has good hopes for, until he finds out he's moving away to Norway for his mother's work. Meanwhile, Dr. Drakken, Shego, Duff Killigan, and Monkey Fist team up to steal the Time Monkey idol, a small magic statuette used to travel through time. Kim chases the villains around the globe, but she fails to stop them from stealing the Time Monkey's pieces and activating it.

Kim is visited by a talking mole-rat from the future, a descendant of Rufus named Rufus 3000, who gives Kim a time-travel device and explains that the "Supreme One" has taken over the world in the future and she is the only one that can prevent it. Meanwhile, Drakken, Killigan, and Monkey Fist turn themselves into children and travel back in time to Kim's first day in pre-school in order to discourage her from becoming a crime-fighter. Posing as her schoolmates, the villains try to bully the four-year-old Kim, but she fights them off and becomes friends with four-year-old Ron, while the high-school-age Kim arrives through a time portal to fight Shego.

Foiled, the villains turn back into adults and escape forward in time, to the day of Kim and Ron's first adventure. Monkey Fist goes into the ancient past and retrieves a giant stone gorilla to attack pre-teen Kim and Ron, but they destroy it with the help of their present-day selves. During the fight, Shego is visited by herself from the future, who urges her to steal the Time Monkey. Drakken, Killigan, and Monkey Fist are arrested, but Shego escapes with the Time Monkey into the future. Rufus 3000 arrives and reveals to Kim that the Supreme One is Shego and not Drakken as she originally thought. Kim then activates a portal and she, Ron, Rufus, and Rufus 3000 go twenty years into the future to stop her.

In the future, Shego has become dictator of the world and enslaved the global population. Kim and Ron are captured and sent to their old high school to be brainwashed into obedience, but they are rescued by Kim's younger twin brothers, Tim and Jim, along with Rufus 3000 and an army of naked mole-rats. Kim and Ron are taken to the secret headquarters of the resistance movement, whose leader turns out to be their old computer guru Wade Load. Together, they sneak into Shego's palace, where they fight their way past Monkey Fist and Killigan (now a cyborg) to Shego's throne room where she keeps the Time Monkey. Shego is waiting for them however, and has Kim engage in battle with Drakken, who has undergone genetic enhancements to become super-humanly strong. Kim's old friend Monique, also a part of the resistance, breaks into the palace to assist her, but the two are eventually defeated while Jim, Tim, Wade, and Rufus 3000 are captured by Killigan and Monkey Fist.

Shego reveals that she separated Kim and Ron by making money in the dot-com bubble, buying the company that Ron's mother worked for and having her transferred to Norway, her reason being that while together, Kim and Ron actually made a decent team, but if they were apart, they couldn't stop her. Angered at Shego for having made him move to Norway, Ron overpowers Drakken and accidentally destroys the Time Monkey, undoing all the effects the idol had done to the time stream. This causes Kim, Ron, and Rufus to float through a time gate and travel back to the first scene of the film, at the end of Kim and Ron's first day of school at the beginning of the film. At the moment when the first time disturbance occurred, a wave of temporal distortion washes over Kim and Ron. When it passes, Shego's future is erased and the world is restored to its original state, the two teens having lost all memory of the film's events.

Cast

 Christy Carlson Romano as Kimberly Ann "Kim" Possible
 Dakota Fanning as Pre-school Kim
 Will Friedle as Ronald "Ron" Stoppable
 Harrison Fahn as Pre-school Ron
 Nancy Cartwright as Rufus
 Michael Dorn as Rufus 3000
 Tahj Mowry as Wade Load
 Michael Clarke Duncan as Future Wade
 Nicole Sullivan as Shego
 John DiMaggio as Dr. Drakken
 Tom Kane as Monkey Fist
 Brian George as Duff Killigan
 Gary Cole as Dr. James Timothy Possible
 Jean Smart as Dr. Ann Possible
 Shaun Fleming as Jim and Tim Possible
 Freddie Prinze Jr. as Future Jim and Future Tim
 Raven-Symoné as Monique
 Vivica A. Fox as Future Monique
 Kirsten Storms as Bonnie Rockwaller 
 Kelly Ripa as Future Bonnie

Release
The film was aired on November 28, 2003, between the 13th and the 15th episode of the second season of Kim Possible. In the re-runs, the film was usually split in three episodes, and serves as episodes 26, 27 and 28 of season 2. It was released on DVD on March 16, 2004 in the U.S. (Region 1)  and on March 14, 2005 in the U.K. (Region 2). On Disney+, the film is only available as three episodes.

References

External links

 
 Kim Possible: A Sitch in Time on Disney.com

2003 television films
2003 animated films
2003 films
Kim Possible films
Animated films based on animated series
Animated films about time travel
Films set in the 1990s
Films set in 2003
Films set in the 2020s
2000s American animated films
2000s action comedy films
2000s science fiction comedy films
Disney television films
American animated television films
Child versions of cartoon characters
Disney Television Animation films
Disney direct-to-video animated films
2003 comedy films
Films directed by Steve Loter